Barton is a community in the Canadian province of Nova Scotia, located in the District of Clare in Digby County. The village is named after the loyalist Lieutenant Colonel Joseph Barton of a New Jersey Volunteer Regiment.

References

Communities in Digby County, Nova Scotia
General Service Areas in Nova Scotia